The Welch Award in Chemistry is awarded annually by the Robert A. Welch Foundation, based in Houston, Texas, to encourage and recognise basic chemical research for the benefit of mankind.  The award, which has been given since 1972, is one of the largest and most prestigious awards in the field of chemistry. Several of its recipients subsequently were awarded the Nobel Prize.

The award is named in honor of Robert Alonzo Welch, who made a fortune in oil and minerals and had a strong belief in the ability of chemistry to make the world a better place. In his will, Mr. Welch stated:  “I have long been impressed with the great possibilities for the betterment of Mankind that lay in the field of research in the domain of Chemistry.”  The prize has a value of $500,000.

Recipients
Source: Welch Foundation

See also
List of chemistry awards
List of prizes named after people

References

American science and technology awards
Chemistry awards
Awards established in 1972